"The Last Thing on Your Mind" is a song by Canadian singer-songwriter Lights from her debut self-titled EP. It has been featured in the Old Navy commercials, with Lights as the singer at the club. It is also featured as a remix on her album, The Listening.

Old Navy: Neon Nights commercial
The video began airing in May 2008. It was directed by Landis Smithers, Richard Christiansen and Paul Norman. The song has been featured in a series of Old Navy commercials along with several other Lights songs. It is currently the only video released for it.
It centers a young woman who is at a dance club with her friends. She gets a call on her cell phone and seems to be arguing with someone (presumably her boyfriend). The bartender sees this and slides her a drink to cheer her up. Her friends try to keep her mind off the phone, but no matter what they do, she can't stop waiting for a call. Eventually, her phone does ring, but it's from the bartender. Lights appears in the video, performing at the club.

References

Lights (musician) songs
2008 songs
Songs written by Lights (musician)